Martin Dulák (born 21 September 1988) is a Slovak professional ice hockey player who played with HC Slovan Bratislava in the Slovak Extraliga.

References

Living people
1988 births 
HC Slovan Bratislava players
Place of birth missing (living people)
Slovak ice hockey defencemen
HK Spišská Nová Ves players